Chattanooga Roller Derby (CRD) is a women's flat track roller derby league based in Chattanooga, Tennessee. Founded in 2008, the league consists of a single travel team, which competes against teams from other leagues, and is a member of the Women's Flat Track Derby Association (WFTDA).

League history 
The league was formed in August 2008 as Chattanooga Roller Girls, by about thirty women.  It played its first bout in December 2009 and, by mid-2011, was attracting crowds of more than 1,000 people.

Chattanooga was accepted into the WFTDA Apprentice Program in April 2010, and became a full member of the WFTDA in September 2012.

In 2020, the league changed its name to Chattanooga Roller Derby.

WFTDA rankings

References

Roller derby leagues established in 2008
Roller derby leagues in Tennessee
Sports in Chattanooga, Tennessee
Women's Flat Track Derby Association Division 3
2008 establishments in Tennessee
Women's sports in Tennessee